The boys' doubles tournament of the 2017 Asian Junior Badminton Championships was held from July 26 to 30. The defending champions of the last edition were Han Chengkai and Zhou Haodong from China. The Chinese pair Di Zijian and Wang Chang claim the title after defeat the No. 2 seed from South Korea Lee Sang-min and Na Sung-seung in straight games with the score 21–19, 21–11.

Seeded

 Krishna Prasad Garaga / Dhruv Kapila (quarterfinals)
 Lee Sang-min / Na Sung-seung (Finals)
 Su Li-wei / Ye Hong-wei (second round)
 Wachirawit Sothon / Natthapat Trinkajee (quarterfinals)
 Rehan Naufal Kusharjanto / Rinov Rivaldy (second round)
 Chen Sihang / Fan Qiuyue (third round)
 Chang Yee Jun / Ng Eng Cheong (third round)
 Dmitriy Panarin / Ikramzhan Yuldashev (second round)

Draw

Finals

Top half

Section 1

Section 2

Section 3

Section 4

Bottom half

Section 5

Section 6

Section 7

Section 8

References

External links 
Main Draw

2017 Badminton Asia Junior Championships